James Thomas Medcalf (2 May 1895 – 1980) was an English footballer who played as a winger in the Football League for Hull City.

Personal life
At the time he appeared for Hull City, Medcalf worked in a sawmill. He served as a private in the King's Own Yorkshire Light Infantry during the First World War and was invalided out of the army in 1918. After the war, he worked as a wool machinist in Hull.

Career statistics

References

1895 births
1980 deaths
Date of death missing
Sportspeople from Scarborough, North Yorkshire
Footballers from North Yorkshire
Association football wingers
English footballers
English Football League players
Hull City A.F.C. players
British Army personnel of World War I
King's Own Yorkshire Light Infantry soldiers